The Alabama Crimson Tide football team competes as part of the NCAA Division I Football Bowl Subdivision (FBS), representing the University of Alabama in the Western Division of the Southeastern Conference (SEC). Since the establishment of the team in 1892, Alabama has appeared in 75 bowl games. Included in these games are 40 combined appearances in the traditional "big four" bowl games (the Rose, Sugar, Cotton, and Orange), 6 Bowl Championship Series (BCS) game appearances (including three victories in the BCS National Championship Game) and six appearances in the College Football Playoff, and three victories in the College Football Playoff National Championship Game.

Alabama's first bowl game was in 1926, when Wallace Wade led them to the first of three Rose Bowls during his tenure and defeated Washington 20–19. Taking over for Wade following the 1930 season, between 1931 and 1946  Frank Thomas led Alabama to six bowl appearances including three Rose, and one trip each to the Cotton, Orange and Sugar Bowls. After Thomas, Harold Drew led Alabama to the Sugar, Orange and Cotton Bowls between 1947 and 1954. After a five-year bowl absence, Alabama made the first of 24 consecutive bowl appearances under Paul "Bear" Bryant in the 1959 Liberty Bowl. From 1959 to 1982, Bryant led the Crimson Tide to eight Sugar, five Orange, four Cotton, four Liberty, two Bluebonnet and one Gator Bowls.

After Bryant retired, Ray Perkins extended Alabama's consecutive bowl game streak to 25 years with a victory in the 1983 Sun Bowl. However, the streak ended when the 1984 team finished the season with a record of five wins and six losses and failed to qualify for a bowl for the first time in 26 years. The bowl absence lasted only one season as Perkins led the Crimson Tide to wins in both the Aloha and Sun Bowls before he resigned as head coach following the 1986 season. Bill Curry continued the bowl tradition and led the Crimson Tide to Hall of Fame, Sun and Sugar Bowl appearances in his three seasons as head coach. After Curry, Gene Stallings took Alabama to the Fiesta, Blockbuster, Gator, Citrus and Outback Bowls. Stallings also led the Crimson Tide to victory in the first Bowl Coalition national championship game with a 34–13 victory over Miami in the Sugar Bowl. In August 1995, as part of the penalty imposed by the NCAA for rules violations, Alabama was ruled ineligible to participate in the 1995 bowl season.

Following the retirement of Stallings, Mike DuBose was hired as head coach. After failing to qualify for a bowl game in 1997, DuBose led the Crimson Tide to the inaugural Music City Bowl and Alabama's first BCS bowl berth in the Orange Bowl. After again failing to qualify for a bowl in 2000, DuBose was fired and Dennis Franchione was hired as head coach. In his first season, Franchione led Alabama to the Independence Bowl. In February 2002, the NCAA found Alabama violated multiple rules, and as part of its penalty a two-year bowl ban was imposed to include both the 2002 and 2003 seasons. Eligible again to compete in bowl games, Mike Shula led Alabama to the Music City Bowl and a victory in the Cotton Bowl. However, in 2009, Alabama was again found to have violated NCAA rules between 2005 and 2007 and as part of their penalty, the 2006 Cotton Bowl Classic victory was officially vacated. In the week following the 2006 loss to Auburn, Shula was fired and Joe Kines served as interim head coach for the Independence Bowl loss.

In January 2007, Nick Saban was hired as head coach, and has led the Crimson Tide to 15 bowl appearances in his twelve seasons at Alabama. After defeating Colorado in the Independence Bowl, Saban led Alabama to their second BCS bowl against Utah in the Sugar Bowl. In 2009, Saban led the Crimson Tide to the BCS National Championship Game, and defeated Texas 37–21 to clinch the program's first national title of the BCS era. A year after Alabama defeated Michigan State in the 2011 Capital One Bowl, the Crimson Tide defeated LSU in the BCS National Championship Game to clinch the program's second national title of the BCS era. The following season, the Crimson Tide won their second consecutive BCS National Championship Game by a final score of 42–14 over Notre Dame. In their latest bowl appearance, Alabama defeated Ohio State in the 2021 College Football Playoff National Championship. The win brings Alabama's overall bowl record to 44 wins, 26 losses, and 3 ties, placing the Crimson Tide in first place among all FBS schools for both bowl appearances and victories.

Key

Bowl games

Notes

References
General

Specific

Alabama Crimson Tide

Alabama Crimson Tide bowl games